Chapter One: Book of Entrance is the first album by American composer Bill Laswell issued under the moniker Sacred System. It was released on May 14, 1996 by ROIR.

Track listing

Personnel 
Adapted from the Chapter One: Book of Entrance liner notes.

produced and arranged by Bill Laswell

Musicians
Bill Laswell – bass guitar, drum programming, keyboards, musical arrangements, producer
Technical personnel
Anton Fier – technician
Robert Musso – engineering, programming
Sneak Attack – cover art

mastered by Michael Fossenkemper at Turtle Tone Studio, NYC

Release history

References

External links 
 Chapter One: Book of Entrance at Bandcamp
 

1996 albums
Bill Laswell albums
ROIR albums
Albums produced by Bill Laswell